KBRI may refer to:

 KBRI (FM), a radio station (104.1 FM) licensed to serve Clarendon, Arkansas, United States
 KBRI (defunct), a defunct radio station (1570 AM) formerly licensed to serve Brinkley, Arkansas